Aguada de Guerra is a village and development commission in the Meseta area of Somuncurá, in the Department of 25 de Mayo in the Río Negro Province in the Patagonia region of Argentina.

Communication
It is located at 305th km of the National Route 23. The railway train stop is at Patagonia.

Population
Aguada de Guerra had a population of 175 inhabitants (INDEC, 2001), representing an increase of 25% compared to 140 inhabitants (INDEC, 1991) the previous census.

Tourism
Every April month, the Fiesta Provincial de la Cabra is celebrated.

References

Populated places in Río Negro Province